Kine Hallan Steiwer (born 23 May 1988) is a Norwegian orienteering competitor and junior world champion.

She won a gold medal in the relay at the 2007 Junior World Orienteering Championships in Dubbo, together with Silje Ekroll Jahren and Siri Ulvestad, in a close race with the Swedish team. She also received a silver medal in the long course.

At the 2008 Junior World Orienteering Championships in Göteborg Steiwer, together with Annette Baklid and Mariann Ulvestad, ran for second team of Norway and brought home a bronze medal in the relay.

She is an older sister of Gaute Hallan Steiwer.

References

External links
 

Norwegian orienteers
Sportspeople from Oslo
Foot orienteers
1988 births
Living people
Female orienteers
21st-century Norwegian women
Junior World Orienteering Championships medalists